Nyctemera swinhoei is a moth of the family Erebidae first described by Rob de Vos in 2002. It is found on the northern Moluccas (Bacan, Halmahera, Morotai, Obi, Ternate).

References

Nyctemerina
Moths described in 2002